Gregory Arthur Phillinganes (born May 12, 1956) is an American keyboardist, singer-songwriter, and musical director based in Los Angeles, California. A prolific session musician, Phillinganes has contributed to numerous albums representing a broad array of artists and genres. He has toured with notable artists, such as Stevie Wonder, Eric Clapton, David Gilmour and Toto, served as musical director for Michael Jackson, and has released two solo studio albums.

Biography
Gregory Arthur Phillinganes was born on May 12, 1956, in Detroit, Michigan. He began playing a neighbor's piano by ear at the age of two, beginning lessons a few years later after his mother purchased a piano for him. He took lessons from two different instructors before his mother brought him to Misha Kotler, a Detroit Symphony Orchestra pianist who introduced the discipline and technique Phillinganes required to excel. Phillinganes credits Kotler with showing him proper hand posture and for influencing him to play with "a sense of dexterity and definition".

Phillinganes was discovered by Stevie Wonder after the drummer Ricky Lawson gave him a cassette of instrumental renditions of his own songs by Phillinganes. Phillinganes auditioned for Wonder's band, Wonderlove, and played with them from 1976 to 1981.

The year 1978 began a three-decade-long involvement with Michael Jackson and the Jacksons for Phillinganes. He arranged the Jacksons' 1978 album Destiny and played keyboard on the 1980s Triumph album. In the process, he became close with the Jackson family, accompanying them to Walt Disney World and referring to Katherine Jackson as "mom". He contributed to every one of Michael Jackson's solo albums, and cites the title track from 1982's Thriller as a classic example of his work. In an interview with Atlanta, Phillinganes recalled, "I did the synth bass part, those high-pitched synth parts, I did the Rhodes [keyboard] part and even did the pipe organ that Vincent Price does his rap over. It was crazy! When I listen to it now, I just think about all the fun we had creating all those layers in the studio." Although paid as a session musician for his contributions to Thriller, the best-selling album of all time, Phillinganes noted that he and the other participating musicians do not receive royalties. He was the musical director for Michael Jackson's Bad and Dangerous concert tours, as well as the Michael Jackson: 30th Anniversary Special. He describes his involvement with the 30th Anniversary Special as particularly emotional considering his long history with the family. Phillinganes has spoken at length about how much of his life he had spent with the Jacksons, and Michael in particular.

In 1981, Phillinganes released his first solo album, Significant Gains. The Boston Globe reviewer Richard Cromonic noted Wonder's influence on the album, and praised the creativity of the compositions. He criticized the lyrics as being less creative, and said that Significant Gains might be too close to Wonder's sound, calling it "blatant emulation". While the album was not successful, the song "Baby, I Do Love You" was a minor R&B hit. Three years later, Phillinganes released his follow-up album Pulse, which featured another minor hit (and perhaps his best-known solo hit), a cover of Yellow Magic Orchestra's song "Behind the Mask" (with additional lyrics written by Michael Jackson).  This single was more successful on the dance music charts. When he later joined Eric Clapton's backing band, Phillinganes introduced the tune to Clapton, who covered it on his 1986 August album.  Amidst his solo recordings and touring with Clapton throughout the 1980s and the early 1990s, he became well known as a prominent session musician for a multitude of different artists, performing on many hit albums of the time.  His session work has continued into the present.

In addition to Stevie Wonder, Greg Phillinganes has worked and toured with other musicians including George Harrison, the Bee Gees, Donna Summer, Anita Baker, George Benson, Karen Carpenter, Eric Clapton, Donald Fagen, Aretha Franklin, Patti LaBelle, Michael Jackson, Richard Marx, Paul McCartney, Al Jarreau, Quincy Jones, and Stevie Nicks among others. In 1995 he played on the Joan Armatrading album What's Inside. Starting in 2005, Phillinganes filled in for the semi-retired David Paich on tour with the band Toto. He subsequently became a full-time member of the band and contributed to their album Falling in Between. He continued to tour as a member of Toto until the band became inactive in 2008. When Toto reformed in 2010 to resume touring and working on new material, Phillinganes had been replaced in the lineup by original keyboardist Steve Porcaro. In 2022 Phillinganes was reunited with Toto when he filled in for Dominic Xavier during the 'Dogs of Oz' tour during the Norwegian shows.

Phillinganes served as the musical director for Cirque du Soleil's Michael Jackson: The Immortal World Tour for its entire run from 2011 to 2014. Phillinganes was Musical Director for the 2014 Women of Soul performance at The White House featuring, amongst others Aretha Franklin, Patti LaBelle, Ariana Grande and Jill Scott. In 2014 and 2015 he performed with Stevie Wonder again in the Songs in the Key of Life Tour, also serving "as the tour's Music Director." He toured with the European leg of David Gilmour's Rattle That Lock tour.

Phillinganes won a 2015 Creative Arts Emmy Award for Outstanding Music Direction for his role as musical director for the television special "Stevie Wonder: Songs In The Key Of Life" and was music director for the 2016 Grammy Awards.

In 2022 Phillinganes were featured in several episodes of the podcast series Stories in the Room: Michael Jackson's Thriller Album Podcast.

Selected discography
Solo
 Significant Gains (1981)
 Pulse (1984)

With Quincy Jones
 One Hundred Ways (1981) - The synth melody used in the song would later be sampled by MF Doom in his song Rhymes Like Dimes (1999)

With John Mayer

Sob Rock (2021)

With Michael Jackson
 Off the Wall (1979)
 Thriller (1982)
 Bad (1987)
 Dangerous (1991)

With David Gilmour
 Live at Pompeii (2017)

With Laura Branigan
 Laura Branigan (1990)

With Donna Summer
 Donna Summer (1982)

With Sheryl Crow
 Threads (2019)

With Mick Jagger
 Primitive Cool (1987)

With Deniece Williams
 When Love Comes Calling (1978)
 Special Love (1989)

With Thelma Houston
 Ready to Roll (1978)

With Dionne Warwick
 Finder of Lost Loves (1985)
 Reservations for Two (1987)

With Richard Marx
 Rush Street (1991)
 Flesh and Bone (1997)
 Days in Avalon (2000)

With Toni Braxton
 Secrets (1996)
 The Heat (2000)
 Libra (2005)

With Stephen Bishop
 Bish (1978)

With Brenda Russell
 Kiss Me with the Wind (1990)
 Paris Rain (2000)

With Paul Simon
 Hearts and Bones (1983)
 The Rhythm of the Saints (1990)

With Michael Bublé
 Call Me Irresponsible (2007)

With Bill Withers
 Watching You Watching Me (1985)

With Michael McDonald
 If That's What It Takes (1982)
 Blink of an Eye (1993)

With Barbra Streisand
 Back to Broadway (1993)
 Higher Ground (1997)

With Rod Stewart
 Soulbook (2009)

With Leo Sayer
 Leo Sayer (1978)

With Elvis Costello
 Painted From Memory (1998)

With Stevie Nicks
 Rock a Little (1985)

With Willie Nelson
 The Great Divide (2002)

With Anita Baker
 Rapture (1986)
 Compositions (1990)
 Rhythm of Love (1994)

With Ronan Keating
 When Ronan Met Burt (2011)

With Faith Evans
 Keep the Faith (1998)

With Paul Young
 The Crossing (1993)

With Melissa Manchester
 Don't Cry Out Loud (1978)

With Natalie Cole
 Dangerous (1985)
 Everlasting (1987)

With Mariah Carey
 Merry Christmas (1994)

With Al Jarreau
 High Crime (1984)
 My Old Friend: Celebrating George Duke (2014)

With Leonard Cohen
 The Future (1992)

With Chaka Khan
 What Cha' Gonna Do for Me (1981)

With Patti Austin
 Patti Austin (1984)
 The Real Me (1988)
 Love Is Gonna Getcha (1990)
 Carry On (1991)
 That Secret Place (1994)
 On the Way to Love (2001)
 Sound Advice (2011)

With Bryan Ferry
 Taxi (1993)

With Ray Parker Jr.
 After Dark (1987)

With Minnie Riperton
 Love Lives Forever (1980)

With Wynonna Judd
 What the World Needs Now Is Love (2003)

With Joan Armatrading
 What's Inside (1995)

With Olivia Newton-John
 Soul Kiss (1985)

With Richie Sambora
 Undiscovered Soul (1998)

With Boz Scaggs
 Fade into Light (1996)
 Dig (2001)

With Cheryl Lynn
 In Love (1979)

With Jennifer Holliday
 Feel My Soul (1983)

With Roberta Flack
 Oasis (1988)
 Set the Night to Music (1991)

With Michael Bolton
 Timeless: The Classics (1992)
 Timeless: The Classics Vol. 2 (1999)

With Ilse DeLange
 Clean Up (2003)

With James Taylor
 October Road (2002)

With Jennifer Rush
 Heart Over Mind (1987)

With Eddie Money
 Life for the Talking (1979)

With Diane Schuur
 Friends For Schuur (2000)

With Philip Bailey
 Triumph (1986)

With Kenny Loggins
 Vox Humana (1985)
 Leap of Faith (1991)
 The Unimaginable Life (1997)

With Patti LaBelle
 Winner in You (1986)
 Burnin (1991)
 Timeless Journey (2004)With Terence Trent D'Arby Symphony or Damn (1993)With Peabo Bryson and Roberta Flack Born to Love (1983)With Neil Diamond Primitive (1984)
 Headed for the Future (1986)
 Melody Road (2014)With Donald Fagen The Nightfly (1982)With Earth, Wind & Fire I've Had Enough  (1981)With Rickie Lee Jones The Magazine (1984)
 Flying Cowboys (1989)
 The Evening of My Best Day (2003)With Lionel Richie Lionel Richie (1982)
 Can't Slow Down  (1983)
 Dancing on the Ceiling  (1986)With Joe Cocker Civilized Man (1984)
 Night Calls (1991)With Stephanie Mills Merciless (1983)With Peter Allen I Could Have Been a Sailor (1979)With Syreeta Wright One to One (1977)With The Jacksons Destiny (1978)
 Triumph (1980)With George Benson Give Me the Night (1980)
 In Your Eyes (1983)
 While the City Sleeps... (1986)
 Songs and Stories (2009)With Toto Falling in Between (2006)With Aretha Franklin Love All the Hurt Away (1981)With Bruno Mars 24K Magic (2016)With Donald Byrd Thank You...For F.U.M.L. (Funking Up My Life) (1978)With Eric Clapton Behind the Sun (1985)
 August (1986)
 Journeyman (1989)
 Pilgrim (1998)With Stevie Wonder Songs in the Key of Life (1976)
 Conversation Peace (1995)
 A Time to Love (2005)With The Pointer Sisters Special Things (1980)
 Black & White (1981)
 So Excited! (1982)
 Break Out (1983)

ReferencesCited sourcesOther sources'

External links
Greg Phillinganes NAMM Oral History Interview (2015)

1956 births
20th-century American musicians
20th-century American male musicians
21st-century American keyboardists
21st-century American male musicians
African-American rock musicians
African-American pianists
American organists
American session musicians
Cass Technical High School alumni
Living people
Musicians from Detroit
People from Detroit
Toto (band) members
20th-century American keyboardists